Las Palmas Atlético is the reserve team of UD Las Palmas, club based in Las Palmas, in the autonomous community of the Canary Islands. They play in Tercera Federación – Group 12, holding home games at Anexo del Estadio Gran Canaria, which holds 2,000 spectators.

The team is officially known as Las Palmas Atlético on the club's official promotion and website, but the rules of the Liga de Fútbol Profesional prohibit B teams from having different names to their parent.

Club background
Unión Athletic Football Club / Unión Atlético Club de Fútbol – (1954–59)
Unión Deportiva Las Palmas Aficionado – (1959–77)
Unión Deportiva Las Palmas Atlético – (1977–91)
Unión Deportiva Las Palmas B – (1991–2008)
Unión Deportiva Las Palmas Atlético – (2008–)

Season to season
As a farm team

As reserve team

13 seasons in Segunda División B
1 season in Segunda División RFEF
32 seasons in Tercera División
1 season in Tercera Federación

Current squad

Reserve team

Out on loan

Current technical staff

Honours
Tercera División (4th tier): 1978–79, 1982–83, 1989–90, 1991–92, 1998–99, 1999–00, 2006–07, 2012–13, 2016–17
Copa Federación de España: 1994–95

References

External links
Official website 
Futbolme.com profile 
Estadios de España 

UD Las Palmas
Spanish reserve football teams
Football clubs in the Canary Islands
Association football clubs established in 1959
Sport in Las Palmas
1959 establishments in Spain